Aimee Bender (born June 28, 1969) is an American novelist and short story writer, known for her surreal stories and characters. She is a 2011 recipient of the Alex Awards.

Biography
Born to a Jewish family, Bender received her undergraduate degree from the University of California at San Diego, and a Master of Fine Arts from the creative writing MFA program at University of California at Irvine. While at UCI she studied with Judith Grossman and Geoffrey Wolff. She received ArtsBridge scholarships and worked with mentor Keith Fowler to create writing programs for K-12 students in Orange County, California.  She currently teaches creative writing at the University of Southern California where she served as Director of the USC PhD in Creative Writing & Literature from 2012 to 2015. In the past she taught a class in surrealist writing at the UCLA Extension Writers' Program and was a senior artist at the non-profit theater workshop The Imagination Workshop, helping mentally ill and at-risk individuals write, direct and act in their own theatrical creations. She has named Oscar Wilde, Hans Christian Andersen, the Brothers Grimm and Anne Sexton as influences on her writing. A native of Los Angeles, Bender is a close friend of fellow UCI alumna Alice Sebold.

Her first book was The Girl in the Flammable Skirt, a collection of short stories, published in 1998. The book was chosen as a New York Times Notable Book of 1998 and spent seven weeks on the Los Angeles Times bestseller list. Her novel An Invisible Sign of My Own was published in 2000, and was named as a Los Angeles Times Pick of the Year. In 2005 she published another collection of short stories, Willful Creatures, which was nominated by The Believer magazine – owned by McSweeney's — as one of the Best Books of the Year. Her novella The Third Elevator was published in 2009 by Madras Press. Her novel The Particular Sadness of Lemon Cake was published in 2010 by Doubleday.

Bender has received two Pushcart Prizes, and was nominated for the James Tiptree, Jr. Award in 2005. Her short story, Faces was a 2009 Shirley Jackson Award finalist. In 2009 Bender became the sitting judge for the Flatmancrooked Writing Prize, a writing award from Flatmancrooked Publishing for new short fiction.

Bender's works have also been published in Granta, GQ, Harper's, Tin House, Opium Magazine, McSweeney's, The Paris Review, The Coffin Factory, and several anthologies. She has also been heard on This American Life and Selected Shorts.

Bibliography
The Girl in the Flammable Skirt (1998) 
An Invisible Sign of My Own (2000) 
Willful Creatures (2005) 
The Third Elevator (2009) 
The Particular Sadness of Lemon Cake (2010) 
The Color Master (2013) 
The Butterfly Lampshade (2020)

References

External links
 
 
 

Living people
University of California, Irvine alumni
University of Southern California people
American women novelists
American women short story writers
University of Southern California faculty
1969 births
Place of birth missing (living people)
Jewish American novelists
20th-century American novelists
21st-century American novelists
20th-century American women writers
21st-century American women writers
20th-century American short story writers
21st-century American short story writers
American women academics
21st-century American Jews